John Wiltshire was an Australian actor and producer who worked extensively in stage, radio and television, notably at the ABC. He produced some of Noël Coward's shows in Australia in 1940, helped establish the Mercury Theatre in Sydney with Peter Finch and produced a number of films with Cecil Holmes including the feature Captain Thunderbolt (1953).

Select credits
Eureka Stockade (1949) – actor
Terrific the Giant (1950) – short – producer
Wherever She Goes (1951) – actor
Captain Thunderbolt (1953) – producer

References

External links
John Wiltshire at National Film and Sound Archive

Australian male actors